Feng Yuanwei (August 1930 – 15 July 2019) was a People's Republic of China politician and scholar. He was born in Xichang, the capital of Liangshan Yi Autonomous Prefecture in Sichuan province. An ethnic Yi, his Yi name was Bahu Mumou. He attended Southwest University for Nationalities. He was the 6th CPPCC Committee Chairman of his home province.

References

1930 births
2019 deaths
People's Republic of China politicians from Sichuan
Chinese Communist Party politicians from Sichuan
Political office-holders in Sichuan
Southwest University for Nationalities alumni
People from Xichang
Yi people
Politicians from Liangshan